Antonio Flores de Lemus (1876–1941) was a Spanish politician and economist.

Life
Born in Jaén, he majored in Law at the universities of Granada and Oviedo. He was university professor of Political Economy in the universities of Barcelona (1904) and Madrid (1920), besides holding numerous positions for the Ministry of Property.
He was involved in studies of the Spanish economy as an economist, and published diverse works about agriculture and the running of the economy.

Published works

 La reforma arancelaria, consideraciones y materiales (1905)
 Sobre una dirección fundamental de la producción rural española (1926)
 Sobre el problema económico de España (1928)
 Dictamen de la Comisión para el Estudio de la Implantación del Patrón Oro (1929)

References

Further reading

 Aracil Fernández, Mª J. (2001): El professor Flores de Lemus y los estudios de Hacienda Pública en España. Instituto de Estudios Fiscales, Madrid.
 Fuentes Quintana, E. (2001): “Flores de Lemus en el Ministerio de Hacienda”, en Fuentes Quintana, E. (director): Economía y economistas españoles, tomo 6. Galaxia Gutenberg y Círculo de Lectores, Madrid.
 Serrano Sanz, José Mª (2001): “El <<curriculum vitae>> y la obra de don Antonio Flores de Lemus”, en Fuentes Quintana, E. (director): Economía y economistas españoles, tomo 6. Galaxia Gutenberg y Círculo de Lectores, Madrid.
 Velarde Fuertes, J. (2001): “El legado de Flores de Lemus”, en Fuentes Quintana, E. (director): Economía y economistas españoles, tomo 6. Galaxia Gutenberg y Círculo de Lectores, Madrid.

External links
 Flors de Lemus at Biografiasyvidas.com

Spanish politicians
Spanish economists
1876 births
1941 deaths
University of Oviedo alumni